Alois Büchel (born 16 April 1941) is a Liechtenstein athlete. He competed in the men's decathlon at the 1960 Summer Olympics and the 1964 Summer Olympics.

References

1941 births
Living people
Athletes (track and field) at the 1960 Summer Olympics
Athletes (track and field) at the 1964 Summer Olympics
Liechtenstein decathletes
Olympic athletes of Liechtenstein